Estadio Bicentenario Municipal de La Florida is a multi-purpose stadium, located in La Florida, in eastern Santiago, Chile. It is the home stadium of Chilean football team Audax Italiano. The stadium was built in 1986 and rebuilt in 2008.

The stadium also hosts a variety of events such as summer theatre festivals and music concerts, such as the KISS concert in early 2009. Faith No More performed at the stadium on October 30, 2009 as part of their The Second Coming Tour. The stadium has also been used for concerts by System of a Down, Primus, Rage Against the Machine, The Mars Volta, The Black Eyed Peas, Green Day, Rammstein, and Dua Lipa among others.

In 2007, La Florida was selected as a venue for the 2008 FIFA U-20 Women's World Cup. In order to comply with FIFA standards, the old stadium was torn down and a completely new venue was built. The capacity of the latter was increased from 7,000 to 12,000 people. The new stadium was inaugurated on November 12, 2008.

Gallery

References

External links
FIFA site
Audax Italiano Football Team
Municipalidad de La Florida

Bicentenario de La Florida
Multi-purpose stadiums in Chile
Bicentenario de La Florida
Audax Italiano
Sports venues completed in 1986
Sports venues completed in 2008
1986 establishments in Chile